Miguel Guzmán (born 22 January 1961) is an Argentine professional golfer.

Born in Santiago del Estero, Guzmán worked as a caddie in Santiago del Estero, before turning professional in 1981.

During his career, Guzmán won the Argentine Professional Ranking in 1990. He won more than twenty tournaments in South America.

Guzmán played on European Tour in 1993 and his best finish was 16th in the Kronenbourg Open. He represented Argentina in the World Cup on two occasions and was 6th in 1990 with your partner Luis Carbonetti.

Professional wins (25)

Tour de las Américas wins (1)
2005 Brazil Open

TPG Tour wins (2)

Other Argentine wins (17)
1989 South Open, North Open
1990 Carilo Open, South Open, Cardales Grand Prix, San Diego Grand Prix, Abierto del Litoral
1993 North Open
1994 La Plata Open, Norpatagonico Open
1996 La Plata Open
1997 North Open
1998 South Open
1999 Buenos Aires Open, Neuquen Open
2001 Acantilados Grand Prix
2002 Ranelagh Open

Colombian wins (3)
1994 Bogota Open
1998 Colombian Open
2000 Serrezuela Open

Other wins (2)
1979 Argentine National Caddies Tournament
1994 Campestre Selaya Club Grand Prix (Mex)

Team appearances
Dunhill Cup (representing Argentina): 1990
World Cup (representing Argentina): 1990, 1994

References

External links

Argentine male golfers
European Tour golfers
Sportspeople from Santiago del Estero Province
People from Santiago del Estero
1961 births
Living people